Cultural depictions of dogs in art has become more elaborate as individual breeds evolved and the relationships between human and canine developed. Hunting scenes were popular in the Middle Ages and the Renaissance. Dogs were depicted to symbolize guidance, protection, loyalty, fidelity, faithfulness, alertness, and love.

As dogs became more domesticated, they were shown as companion animals, often painted sitting on a lady's lap. Throughout art history, mainly in Western art, there is an overwhelming presence of dogs as status symbols and pets in painting.  The dogs were brought to houses and were allowed to live in the house. They were cherished as part of the family, and were regarded highly by the upper classes, who used them for hunting and could afford to feed them. Hunting dogs were generally connected to the aristocracy. Only the nobility were allowed to keep hunting dogs, and this would signal status.

Dog portraits became increasingly popular in the 18th century, and the establishment of The Kennel Club in the United Kingdom of Great Britain and Ireland in 1873, and the American Kennel Club in 1884 introduced breed standards or 'word pictures', which further encouraged the popularity of dog portraiture.

Early history

There are illustrations of dogs on the walls of tombs dating back to the Bronze Age, as well as statues, children's toys, and ceramics depicting dogs. Hunting dogs are commonly portrayed. One of the prehistoric paintings estimated to be 9,000 years old found at the Bhimbetka rock shelters in India depict a dog held on a leash by a man. Rock art of Tassili n'Ajjer also include depictions that are highly suggestive of dogs.
 
The Ancient Greeks and Romans, contrary to the Semitic cultures, favored dogs as pets, valuing them for their faithfulness and courage; they were often seen on Greek and Roman reliefs and ceramics as symbols of fidelity. Dogs were given as gifts among lovers and kept as pets, guardians, and for hunting. Dogs were appreciated by the Greeks for their faith and love. Homer's Odyssey tells the story of Odysseus, who raised a dog called Argos, and who was the only one that recognized him when he returned home after his travels, disguised to conceal his appearance. This theme has been often depicted in ancient Greek vases.

The ancient Romans kept three types of dogs: hunting dogs, especially sighthounds; Molossus dogs like the Neapolitan Mastiff, often depicted in reliefs and mosaics with the words "Cave Canem"; and small companion dogs like the Maltese, used as women's lap dogs. Greyhounds were often represented as sculptures. Large dogs were used in war by the Roman army, arranged in attack formation, or for wolf-hunting on horseback,  which was a popular sport.

Middle Ages 

Generally, dogs symbolize faith and loyalty. A dog, when included in an allegorical painting, portrays the attribute of fidelity personified. In a portrait of a married couple, a dog placed in a woman's lap or at her feet can represent marital fidelity. If the portrait is of a widow, a dog can represent her continuing faithfulness to the memory of her late husband.

An example of a dog representing marital fidelity is present in Jan van Eyck's Arnolfini Portrait. An oil painting on oak panel dated 1434 by the Early Netherlandish painter Jan van Eyck, it is a small full-length double portrait,<ref name="ReferenceA">Erwin Panofsky published an article entitled Jan van Eyck's 'Arnolfini' Portrait in the Burlington Magazine 1934</ref> which is believed to represent the Italian merchant Giovanni di Nicolao Arnolfini and his wife, presumably in their home in the Flemish city of Bruges. The little dog symbolizes faithfulness, devotion or loyalty, or can be seen as an emblem of lust, signifying the couple's desire to have a child. Unlike the couple, the dog looks out to meet the gaze of the viewer. The dog could also be simply a lap dog, a gift from husband to wife. Many wealthy women in the court had lap dogs as companions, reflecting wealth or social status.
During the Middle Ages, images of dogs were often carved on tombstones to represent the deceased's feudal loyalty or marital fidelity.

Hunting scenes

Hunting scenes were common topics in medieval and Renaissance art. Hunting in the medieval period was a sport exclusive to the aristocracy, and hunting was an essential part of court etiquette. Depictions of people with a hunting dog, hawks or falcons would signal status. Hunting dogs were connected to aristocracy, as only the nobility was allowed to hunt. Different breeds of dogs were used for different types of hunting. Hunting with dogs was so popular during the Middle Ages that wild bears were hunted to extinction in England.

Hunting dogs are seldom seen depicted in the company of clerics, due to a prohibition of the activity decreed by the Fourth Council of the Lateran, held under Pope Innocent III.

 In heraldry

As the aristocracy often used hunting dogs, dogs were shown as symbols in heraldry. In the late Middle Ages and the Renaissance, heraldry became a highly developed discipline. Dogs of various types, and occasionally of specific breeds, occur as charges and supporters in many coats of arms, and often symbolise courage, vigilance, loyalty and fidelity.

Three encaustic tiles dating from the 15th century feature a white hound, the Talbot family crest and the inscription "Sir John Talbot" (the 1st Earl of Shrewsbury). Part of a set of four, the tiles were possibly originally used on a church floor. The term "Talbot" is used in heraldry to refer to a good-mannered hunting dog. The Talbot dog always depicts the Talbot coat of arms and is the original hound used as an English heraldic symbol. It is portrayed in the family arms of several noble German families and at least seven other English families.

The greyhound also features very often in British heraldry, and appears on the arms of several English and Scottish families. One family used a winged greyhound for its crest. Other breeds used less often in heraldry include mastiffs, bloodhounds and foxhounds.  A creature referred to as the sea-dog is also used, and resembles the Talbot with scales, webbed paws, a fin along its back and a flat, beaver-like tail. The English heraldist Arthur Charles Fox-Davies believed the sea-dog to have originated from depictions of the beaver, citing as evidence that one of the supporters in the arms of Oxford, which strongly resembles the sea-dog, is officially recorded as being a beaver.

16th and 17th century

During the 16th and 17th century, dogs were depicted in hunting scenes, representing social status, as a lap dog, or sometimes as a personal friend. They were also used as symbols in painting. The Greek philosopher Diogenes (404–323 BC) was depicted by Jean-Léon Gérôme in the company of dogs, serving as emblems of his "Cynic" (Greek: "kynikos," dog-like) philosophy, which emphasized an austere existence.Cf. Plato, Republic Book II Diogenes stated that  "Unlike human beings who either dupe others or are duped, dogs will give an honest bark at the truth. Other dogs bite their enemies, I bite my friends to save them."

In the painting Portrait of a man writing at a table by the Dutch painter Hendrik Martenszoon Sorgh, a Protestant preacher and theologian, with the Bible opened on the table, is depicted with his dog. The dog represents fidelity, vigilance, and regularity in research, owing to the perceived natural intelligence and intuition of a dog."Logical Rudeness"

18th century

 are Japanese miniature sculptures of great artistic merit that also serve a practical function as toggles for cords used to attach small objects, boxes or pouches to kimono, which traditionally have no pockets. Most  production was during 1615–1868, in the Edo period in Japan. Among other motifs,  often depicted dogs. The tradition of showing dogs in hunting scenes continued to the 18th century.

19th and 20th century

The picture entitled A Distinguished Member of the Humane Society'' depicts a dog that was well known in London.  The dog, depicted in 1838 by Sir Edwin Landseer, was a Newfoundland called "Bob" who was found in a shipwreck off the coast of England. The dog found his way to the London waterfront, where he became known for saving people from drowning a total of twenty-three times over the course of fourteen years. For this, he was made a distinguished member of the Royal Humane Society, granting him a medal and access to food. Newfoundlands with white patches are now recognized as a breed of their own, as a "Landseer".

By the Victorian era, the sporting tradition remained, but after the establishment of The Kennel Club in the UK in 1873 and the American Kennel Club in 1884,  breed standards, or "word pictures," were introduced, and dog portraits soared in popularity.

 There are stylistic differences between the British and European depictions; William Secord, a world expert on canine art, stated, "Belgian, Dutch, Flemish and German artists were more influenced by realism, depicting the dog the way it really looked, with dirt on  coat and slobber and that kind of thing. You see Alfred Stevens, who's Belgian, do street dogs and dogs that are suffering, which in England you never see. British depictions were more idealized. They want it pretty, simply put.”

Contemporary

The prices achieved for canine art increased in the 1980s–1990s, and started to gain popularity in established art circles rather than antique markets. Buyers were generally divided into three dominant categories: hunters; breeders and exhibitors of pedigree dogs; and owners of companion animals.

Pablo Picasso frequently included his canine companions in his paintings. Particularly well-known and often featured in his work was a Dachshund, named Lump, who actually belonged to David Douglas Duncan but lived with Picasso.

Depictions of dogs have extended as well to the artform of photography, a noted example being the work of photographer Elliott Erwitt.

Picture gallery

See also

List of fictional dogs 
List of individual dogs
Dogs in religion
Dog in Chinese mythology
Dogs in Mesoamerican folklore and myth
Islam and dogs
Laelaps (mythology)
Staffordshire dog figurine

References

Dogs in popular culture
Art history
Dogs in art
Cultural depictions of animals